Arbuckle is a census-designated place (CDP) in Colusa County, California, United States. The population was 3,028 at the 2010 census, up from 2,332 at the 2000 census. The town is characterized by single-family residences, multiple-family units, some mobile homes, and commercial activities. Land surrounding Arbuckle is agriculture including cultivated annual crops, and both active and unmaintained orchards (primarily almond). Various almond hullers may be found near the area. Regional access is provided by the north-south running Interstate 5, along with Old Highway 99 West running alongside Interstate 5.

History
Tacitus R. Arbuckle initially established a ranch here in 1866. The railroad came in 1875 and the town was founded and named for Arbuckle, on whose land it was built.  The post office was established the following year, 1876.

Geography
Two streams drain the area, the Salt and Elk Creeks.  The Salt Creek flows north in the area, then bends east, and is joined by Elk Creek.  Both streams join Sand Creek a half mile northeast of the town and flow in a northeast direction.  Salt Creek is subject to periodic flooding during heavy rainfall.

The town sank  between 2008 and 2017 according to a report issued by the California Department of Water Resources in coordination with 19 local and state agencies. A study that analyzed over 300 sites across the Sacramento Valley found that this area had sank due to groundwater-related subsidence more than any other area in the study. Subsidence occurred as water was removed from the underground aquifers and the surrounding soil collapsed upon itself.

Demographics

2010
The 2010 United States Census reported that Arbuckle had a population of 3,028. The racial makeup of Arbuckle was 1,746 (57.7%) White, 18 (0.6%) African American, 23 (0.8%) Native American, 18 (0.6%) Asian, 5 (0.2%) Pacific Islander, 1,124 (37.1%) from other races, and 94 (3.1%) from two or more races. Hispanic or Latino of any race were 2,116 persons (69.9%).

The Census reported that 3,028 people (100% of the population) lived in households, 0 (0%) lived in non-institutionalized group quarters, and 0 (0%) were institutionalized.

There were 868 households, out of which 481 (55.4%) had children under the age of 18 living in them, 518 (59.7%) were opposite-sex married couples living together, 125 (14.4%) had a female householder with no husband present, 77 (8.9%) had a male householder with no wife present.  There were 61 (7.0%) unmarried opposite-sex partnerships, and 6 (0.7%) same-sex married couples or partnerships. 122 households (14.1%) were made up of individuals, and 70 (8.1%) had someone living alone who was 65 years of age or older. The average household size was 3.49.  There were 720 families (82.9% of all households); the average family size was 3.80.

The population was spread out, with 982 people (32.4%) under the age of 18, 356 people (11.8%) aged 18 to 24, 824 people (27.2%) aged 25 to 44, 635 people (21.0%) aged 45 to 64, and 231 people (7.6%) who were 65 years of age or older.  The median age was 28.3 years. For every 100 females, there were 103.1 males.  For every 100 females age 18 and over, there were 98.8 males.

The homeowner vacancy rate was 4.0%; the rental vacancy rate was 2.7%.  1,899 people (62.7% of the population) lived in owner-occupied housing units and 1,129 people (37.3%) lived in rental housing units.

2000
As of the census of 2000, there were 2,332 people, 650 households, and 533 families residing in the CDP. The racial makeup of the CDP was 50.21% White, 0.17% Black or African American, 2.10% Native American, 0.47% Asian, 0.09% Pacific Islander, 40.44% from other races, and 6.52% from two or more races.  70.75% of the population were Hispanic or Latino of any race.

There were 650 households, out of which 52.6% had children under the age of 18 living with them, 63.2% were married couples living together, 12.6% had a female householder with no husband present, and 18.0% were non-families. 15.2% of all households were made up of individuals, and 8.3% had someone living alone who was 65 years of age or older.  The average household size was 3.59 and the average family size was 3.98.

In the CDP, the population was spread out, with 35.9% under the age of 18, 12.0% from 18 to 24, 27.8% from 25 to 44, 15.7% from 45 to 64, and 8.5% who were 65 years of age or older.  The median age was 26 years. For every 100 females, there were 105.6 males.  For every 100 females age 18 and over, there were 106.5 males.

The median income for a household in the CDP was $35,463, and the median income for a family was $36,573. Males had a median income of $25,875 versus $22,865 for females. The per capita income for the CDP was $13,225.  About 16.3% of families and 17.4% of the population were below the poverty line, including 22.9% of those under age 18 and 7.1% of those age 65 or over.

Politics

Notable people
Frederick C. Weyand (1916-2010) was general in the United States Army who served as the 28th Chief of Staff of the United States Army from 1972-1974.

References

Census-designated places in Colusa County, California
Populated places established in 1875
Census-designated places in California
1875 establishments in California